The Naval Vessels Naming Regulation is a regulation that governs the naming of vessels of the Chinese People's Liberation Army Navy. It was published by the PLAN on November 18, 1978, and was revised on July 10, 1986.

Nomenclature 
The regulation states that surface combatants above cruiser class (i.e. battleships and aircraft carriers) shall be named by the State Council on a case-by-case basis while others are named after geographical locations:

References

See also 
 List of active People's Liberation Army Navy ships

Ship naming conventions
Ships of the People's Liberation Army Navy